Thomas Benjamin Hobhouse (19 June 1807 – 31 December 1876) was a British Liberal Party politician.

Hobhouse was the son of Sir Benjamin Hobhouse, 1st Baronet, by his second wife Amelia, daughter of Reverend Joshua Parry. The Whig politician and pamphleteer Lord Broughton was his half-brother.

He was educated at Balliol College, Oxford, where he matriculated in 1825 and graduated BA in 1828. He was President of the Oxford Union for Trinity term, 1828 after which he entered the Middle Temple and became a barrister-at-law in 1833.

He sat as Member of Parliament for Rochester from 1837 to 1841 and for Lincoln from 1848 to 1852.

Hobhouse died in December 1876, aged 69. He never married.

References

External links

1876 deaths
1807 births
Alumni of Balliol College, Oxford
Members of the Middle Temple
Liberal Party (UK) MPs for English constituencies
UK MPs 1837–1841
UK MPs 1847–1852
Younger sons of baronets
Politics of Lincoln, England
Thomas
Presidents of the Oxford Union